Benode Behari Mukherjee (7 February 1904 – 11 November 1980) was an Indian artist from West Bengal state. Mukherjee was one of the pioneers of Indian modern art and a key figure of Contextual Modernism. He was one of the earliest artists in modern India to take up to murals as a mode of artistic expression. All his murals depict a subtle understanding of environmental through pioneering architectural nuances.

Early life
Binod Behari Mukherjee was born in Behala, in the state of West Bengal, now recently included into Kolkata (2009 onwards) although his ancestral village in Garalgachha in Hooghly District. He taught at Visva Bharati University in Santiniketan.He made his early learning from Sanskrit Collegiate School.

Career
Mukherjee was born with a severe eye problem. Despite being myopic in one eye and blind in the other, he continued to paint and do murals even after he lost his eyesight completely following an unsuccessful eye cataract operation in 1956. In 1919, he took admission in Kala Bhavana, the art faculty of Visva-Bharati University. He was a student of Indian artist Nandalal Bose, and a friend and close associate of Ramkinkar Baij, a sculptor. In 1925, he joined Kala Bhava Bijn as a member of the teaching faculty. He inspired many brilliant students over the years, notable among them are painter Jahar Dasgupta, Ramananda Bandopadhyay, K.G. Subramanyan , Beohar Rammanohar Sinha , sculptor & printmaker Somnath Hore, designer Riten Majumdar and filmmaker Satyajit Ray. In 1949, he left Kala Bhavan and joined as a curator at the Nepal Government Museum in Kathmandu. From 1951 to 1952, he taught at the Banasthali Vidyapith in Rajasthan. In 1952, he along with his wife Leela, started an art training school in Mussoorie. In 1958, he returned to Kala Bhavan, and later became its principal. In 1979, a collection of his Bengali writings, Chitrakar was published.

In Oxford Art Online, R. Si'va Kumar claims, "His major work is the monumental 1947 mural at the Hindi Bhavan, Sha'ntiniketan, based on the lives of medieval Indian saints and painted without cartoons. With its conceptual breadth and synthesis of elements from Giotto and Tawaraya Sotatsu, as well as from the art of such ancient Indian sites as Ajanta and Mamallapuram, it is among the greatest achievements in contemporary Indian painting."

Style

His style was a complex fusion of idioms absorbed from Western modern art and the spirituality of oriental traditions (both Indian and Far-Eastern). Some of his works show a marked influence of Far-Eastern traditions, namely calligraphy and traditional wash techniques of China and Japan. He took lessons in calligraphy from travelling artists from Japan. During 1937-38 he spent a few months in Japan with artists such as Arai Kampō. Similarly he also learnt from the Indian miniature paintings in the frescoes of Mughal and Rajput periods. Idioms of Western modern art also bore heavily upon his style, as he is often seen to blend Cubist techniques (such as multi-perspective and faceting of planes) to solve problems of space. He painted grand murals inside the Visva-Bharati campus. In 1948 he went to become director of National Museum of Kathmandu, in Nepal. In the later years he went to Doon valley, where he started an art school but had to discontinue due to the financial shortage.

In 1972 Mukherjee's former student at Santiniketan, filmmaker Satyajit Ray, made a documentary film on him titled "The Inner Eye". The film is an intimate investigation of Mukherjee's creative persona and how he copes with his blindness being a visual artist..

Awards and honors
In 1974, he received the Padma Vibhushan award. He was conferred with the Deshikottama by the Visva Bharati University in 1977. He received the Rabindra Puraskar in 1980.

References

 Chitrakar : the Artist Benodebehari Mukherjee/translated by K. G. Subramanyan. Calcutta, Seagull Books, 2006, xviii, 196 p., . 
Sinh, Ajay (2007). Against Allegory: Binode Bihari Mukherjee's Medieval Saints at Shantiniketan, in Richard Davis, ed., Picturing the Nation: Iconographies of Modern India, Hyderabad: Orient Longman.
Ghosh, Nemai (2004). Ray and the Blind Painter: An Odyssey into the Inner Eye, Kolkata: New Age.
Chakrabarti, Jayanta, Arun Kumar Nag and R. Sivakumar The Santiniketan Murals, Seagull
Ghulam Mohammed Sheikh and R. Siva Kumar, Benodebehari Mukherjee: A Centenary Retrospective, National Gallery of Modern Art, New Delhi, 2007.

External links

exhibition at national gallery of modern art New Delhi
Versatile genius by Partha Chatterjee on the centenary year
on the centenary year
 Remembering an artist of note
 colours of retina
Art of Bengal
At Vadodra Gallery
Artist profile: Binode Behari Mukherjee

1904 births
1980 deaths
20th-century Indian painters
Visva-Bharati University alumni
Indian male painters
Bengali male artists
Recipients of the Padma Vibhushan in arts
Fellows of the Lalit Kala Akademi
People associated with Santiniketan
Academic staff of Visva-Bharati University
Blind artists
Recipients of the Rabindra Puraskar
Indian art educators
Painters from West Bengal